The Liberty Classic was an annual women's bicycle race held from 1994 to 2012, simultaneously with the Philadelphia International Championship. The 57.6 mile race consisted of four laps of a 14.4 mile circuit through Philadelphia with 5 climbs up the famous Manayunk Wall.  It was part of the UCI Women's Road World Cup until 2001. From 2002, it was an Elite Women's Category 1 event under UCI race classifications.

The Liberty Classic was the final leg of the inaugural 2006 Commerce Bank Triple Crown of Cycling for women.  The Triple Crown was a one-week, 3-race circuit, with the three races taking place in the Eastern Pennsylvania cities of Allentown, Reading and Philadelphia, Pennsylvania.  The opening race was the Lehigh Valley Classic, followed two days later by Reading Classic, with the Liberty Classic finale in Philadelphia three days after the Reading race.

In January 2013 the race's organisers announced that the 2013 International Championship and Liberty Classic had been cancelled, with local media reporting a breakdown in the relationship between the organisers and the city authorities. However, in May of that year a group of local politicians and promoters announced the revival of the men's and women's races as The Philadelphia Cycling Classic, under the direction of Robin Morton.

Past winners

See also
 The Philadelphia Cycling Classic
 Philadelphia International Championship
 Lancaster Classic
 Reading Classic
 List of road bicycle racing events

References

External links
Official site

Cycle races in the United States
Sports in Philadelphia
Recurring sporting events established in 1994
UCI Women's Road World Cup
1994 establishments in Pennsylvania
Women's road bicycle races
2012 disestablishments in Pennsylvania
Defunct cycling races in the United States
Women's sports in Pennsylvania